Lara Veronin, also known as Lara Liang (Chinese:), is a Taiwanese singer.

Career

Nan Quan Mama
Lara was born in California, United States in 1988, and she moved back to Taipei, Taiwan with her older sister, Esther Veronin, and her parents in 2001, where she graduated from Taipei American School in 2006.

Having participated in music performances and music groups from a young age, Veronin was discovered in 2005 by Taiwanese pop star Jay Chou and became the female frontman in Chou's second iteration of his band project: "Nan Quan Mama". That same year, Lara also skyrocketed to fame when she released a duet with Jay Chou titled "Coral Sea". In Nan Quan Mama, Veronin acted not only as performer but often also as songwriter and/or lyricist, where she collaborated often with bandmate Chase Chang (Chinese:張傑|p=Zhāng Jíe) on creating tracks.

During this time, Veronin also made her first forays into acting, having starred in 2006 Taiwanese drama series Engagement for Love with Alex To and Ambrose Hsu. She also was lead actress in 2012 Taiwanese drama series "Alice in Wonder City".

JVR Music

In 2009, Lara left Nan Quan Mama and started her solo career at Jay Chou's label, JVR Music. On December 6, 2010, she formally released her first solo album, "Hello Lara Liang".

On October 29, 2012, Lara released her second solo album titled "Free Spirit", where she started participating in musical and creative direction, composing, and producing as well as in the styling and marketing aspects of album release. Her second album also boasted 11 songs, and she even collaborated with former Nan Quan Mama bandmate Chase on one of the songs, "Fragments"().

Meimeiwawa Multimedia

After much deliberation, Veronin decided to leave JVR Music in 2013 and founded Meimeiwawa Multimedia ("Meiwa Media" for short) with her sister Esther Veronin. Meiwa Media, while simultaneously doubling as Lara's record label and talent agency, also operates as a creative platform putting out content in music, entertainment, and various other subjects. Over the years, the company has put out several visual ventures such as short films, vlogs, and an internet faux-reality web series, titled "Meiwa Diaries". Temporarily setting aside music, Lara joined her sister in the ranks of film production and co-wrote a micro movie titled "TAWKI: Taipei As We Know It", where she also played Holly, the lead. Since then, the Veronin sisters have put out multiple short films and micro movies with Lara as lead actress, including the 2014 production "Who Killed Joanna Wang?" starring Joanna Wang as well as the 2015 productions "Still Better Than Love" and "She Wore Red", which won the award for Best Cinematography in the Tainan 39-Hour Short Film Contestival.

In 2015, Lara released her first single under the Meimeiwawa Multimedia label, a song called "Dida". The accompanying music video was filmed in Taipei and directed by Esther Veronin. The video was selected as the theme song to the "Fluid Sexuality International Film Festival" in 2015 due to the face that it touched upon LGBT themes, something both Veronin sisters have publicly expressed support for. The song was also released in collaboration with Red Cross Society of the Republic of China where a limited amount of physical albums were released for sale, and all profits went towards donations for the Red Cross.

Over the next two years, three more of Lara's singles were released under Meiwa Media：
2016《Where Do We Go》
2017《Play/Turn》
2017《Sunshine》

In 2018, the Veronin sisters decided to challenge themselves by making Lara's third solo album, "Thousand-Faced Beast" into a feature-length film titled "Tomorrow's Star". While Lara takes her debut on the silver screen, once again, as lead actress, she and Esther do not forget to focus on their imperative of empowering females in the independent art industry. Other actors include known Taiwanese celebrities such as Mathilde Lin, Johnny Lu, Denny Huang, Phoebe Yuan, and Stephen Rong. All eight songs and their music videos from the album were woven into the movie in a manner akin to musical films, and four of the songs ("Thousand-Faced Beast", "Watch Out", "Precious Pain", and "No Absolutes") were also released separately as digital singles.

NSMG
Since 2021, Lara has exclusively partnered with NSMG to release her latest album “Dear You”, a tribute to Mandopop love ballads. Focused tracks "Quitting U" and "No More U" have achieved chart-topping success across streaming platforms.

Personal life

Besides voice acting for Disney, Veronin has dabbled in hosting for television and radio, as well as contributed articles to magazines. She stated that one of her first passions was, and is, writing and she hopes to pursue this in various ways in the future.

On May 29, 2015, Veronin's mother died after collapsing from a cardiac stress test due to complaints of chest pain.

Solo concerts
Since the release of her first album "《HELLO 梁心頤》" in 2010, Lara has been active in live performances. In 2015 she also took up a residency at Brown Sugar Jazz Club with sister Esther Veronin. While sometimes she performs with a backing track out of convenience, she tries to perform with a live band whenever possible.

Lara also performs frequently at schools and commercial events around Taiwan, as well as in Malaysia, Australia, and North America. Oftentimes during her solo performances, she also invites friends to join her onstage. Some performers that she's collaborated with in live gigs include, but are not limited to: Joanna Wang, Dawen, Maxine Chi, Alex Ni, DJ Noodles, and Haor.

Work in Music
While she was with Nan Quan Mama, Lara took part in the creation and performance of four albums, all distributed by Alfa Music and Sony Music. After leaving Nan Quan Mama, Lara released two solo albums under JVR Music, and then one more solo albums under Meimeiwawa Multimedia after she left JVR in 2013. She has also received some accolades from competitions or general outstanding musicianship.

Albums

Non-Album Music
Apart from releasing music in albums, Lara also has physical and digital singles, both released and unreleased. Three unreleased singles were written as spokesperson brand theme songs.

Awards and Accolades

Songwriting
Lara has taken on the bulk of her own songwriting as well as occasionally writing for other musicians on their works.

Filmography
Apart from being a singer and songwriter, Lara has also participated in many cinematic projects ranging from music videos to TV series and musicals before even starting her multimedia company.

Naturally once she established Meimeiwawa Multimedia, she started taking on the role of writer as well as producer on certain ventures. In her 2018 joint project with her sister of the 《Thousand-Faced Beast》and《Tomorrow's Star》 double feature, she also took up the role of lead actress in her first feature-length film.

Musicals and Music Videos

Behind the Scenes

Brand Collaborations

Spokesperson Advertising

References

External links

Profile of Lara Veronin at JVR music
Alice in Wonder City review
Helloasia article about Meiwa Diaries
Helloasia Interview

Year of birth missing (living people)
Living people
American musicians of Taiwanese descent
American women musicians of Chinese descent
Taiwanese Mandopop singers
Singers from California
21st-century American singers
21st-century Taiwanese singers
21st-century Taiwanese women singers
21st-century American women